Chris Beasley (born 17 October 1983) is an Australian professional rugby league footballer.

Background
Chris Beasley was born in Sydney, Australia.

References

External links
(archived by archive.is) Search for "Beasley" at qrl.com.au
Search for "Chris Beasley" at bbc.co.uk

1983 births
Living people
Australian people of Welsh descent
Central Queensland Capras players
Crusaders Rugby League players
Rugby league locks
Rugby league players from Sydney
Rugby league second-rows
Saint-Gaudens Bears players
Sportsmen from New South Wales
Wales national rugby league team players